Erika Dunkelmann (17 November 1913 – 14 February 2000) was a German film and television actress. Based in East Germany, she worked regularly for the state-controlled DEFA studios.

Selected filmography
 Das geheimnisvolle Wrack (1954)
 Stärker als die Nacht (1954)
 Ernst Thälmann (1954)
 A Berlin Romance (1956)
 Bärenburger Schnurre (1957)
 Old Barge, Young Love (1957)
 Berlin, Schoenhauser Corner (1957)
 New Year's Eve Punch (1960)

References

Bibliography
 Cowie, Peter & Elley, Derek. World Filmography: 1967. FDUP, 1977.

External links

1913 births
2000 deaths
German film actresses
German television actresses
People from Rostock